Gastrotheca galeata is a species of frog in the family Hemiphractidae.
It is endemic to Peru.
Its natural habitats are subtropical or tropical moist montane forests, subtropical or tropical high-altitude shrubland, and pastureland.

References

Gastrotheca
Amphibians of Peru
Taxonomy articles created by Polbot
Amphibians described in 1978